Sindelbach is a river of Baden-Württemberg, Germany. It is the right headstream of the Körsch, in Möhringen, a district of Stuttgart.

See also
List of rivers of Baden-Württemberg

References

Rivers of Baden-Württemberg
Rivers of Germany

de:Körsch#Sindelbach